Harold Gust Carlson (May 17, 1892 – May 28, 1930) was a professional baseball pitcher in the Major Leagues from 1917 to 1930, for the Chicago Cubs, Philadelphia Phillies and Pittsburgh Pirates.

Carlson used his curveball exclusively, owing to his lack of speed. He played seven years for the Pirates, going 42–55, went 42–48 in four years with the Phillies, and had a mark of 30–17 with the Cubs in four years. He had his most wins in 1926, with 17 (along with 12 losses). He had a career best 2.23 ERA in 1919.

He was a strong hitting pitcher in his 14-year major league career, posting a .223 batting average (159-for-712) scoring 58 
runs, with 5 home runs and 72 RBI and drawing 24 bases on balls. He had 13 RBI in both 1926 and '27. He was also good fielding his position, recording a .971 fielding percentage which was 12 points higher than the league average at his position.

Death
At 3:00 p.m. on May 28, 1930, Carlson was complaining of stomach pains and called a doctor. Approximately 35 minutes after the team physician was called, Carlson died, just as he was being moved to hospital. He was 38 at the time of his death. According to the physician, Carlson died of a stomach hemorrhage. He left behind a wife and a child. Carlson is buried at Arlington Memorial Park Cemetery in Rockford, Illinois.

See also
 List of baseball players who died during their careers

References

External links

 

1892 births
1930 deaths
Major League Baseball pitchers
Baseball players from Illinois
Chicago Cubs players
Philadelphia Phillies players
Pittsburgh Pirates players
Sportspeople from Rockford, Illinois
Rockford Wolverines players
Milwaukee Brewers (minor league) players
Rockford Wolves players
Rockford Wakes players
Grand Rapids Black Sox players
Wichita Falls Spudders players